Stammheim is a railway station in the Swiss canton of Zurich and municipality of Unterstammheim. The station is located on the Winterthur to Etzwilen line and is served by Zurich S-Bahn line S29, which links Winterthur and Stein am Rhein.

References

External links
 
 Stammheim station on Swiss Federal Railway's web site

Stammheim
Stammheim
Railway stations in Switzerland opened in 1875